Młyniska is one of the quarters of the city of Gdańsk, Poland.

Notable residents
 Georg Voigt (politician) (1866–1927), politician

External links
 Map of Młyniska

Districts of Gdańsk